Bad Radkersburg (archaic ) is a spa town in the southeast of the Austrian state of Styria, in the district of Südoststeiermark.

Geography

In the south the town borders Slovenia on the Mur River. On the other side of the river lies its twin city Gornja Radgona (Oberradkersburg) in the Slovenian Styria region. This and the longest sunshine duration in Austria make it an attractive site for tourism with over 100,000 stays per year.

In the course of a Styrian administrative reform, the town merged with the neighbouring municipality of Radkersburg Umgebung with combined population of 3158 inhabitants, in effect from 1 January 2015.

Weather

History
It is not known when Radkersburg was first settled or where the first settlement, mentioned in an 1182 deed, was located. It is also not known when it fell under princely territorial rule. Most likely, Radkersburg originally did not belong to the Dukes of Styria, but possibly to an aristocrat named Radger to whom it had been given by the German king. 
 
A market is documented in a 1265/67 urbarium issued under King Ottokar II of Bohemia, who ruled Styria from 1261 to 1278, however, contemporary research suggests that the present-day town was founded by the Habsburg king Albert I of Germany, Duke of Styria, in the end of the 13th century. The appearance of the city today is apparently based on a precise plan, surrounded by a wall with towers. Radkerburg was first mentioned as a town in 1299. 

Located near the border with the Kingdom of Hungary, it was affected by the armed conflict between King Matthias Corvinus and Emperor Frederick III in the late 15th century. During the Ottoman–Habsburg wars, extended fortifications were laid out according to plans designed by the Italian architect Domenico dell'Allio. Radkersburg was elevated to an Imperial fortress by resolution of the 1582 Diet of Augsburg. 

In the course of the 19th century language conflict, nationalist struggles in the ethnically mixed area arose between the predominantly German-speaking citizens and the Slovene-speaking peasant population down the Mur River. A garrison town of the Austro-Hungarian Army in World War I, it was occupied by troops of the newly emerged Kingdom of Serbs, Croats and Slovenes (Yugoslavia) on 1 December 1918. An armed revolt against the occupation forces, led by Johann Mickl, in order to affiliate the town with German-Austria failed. Nevertheless, by resolution of the 1919 Treaty of Saint-Germain, the area north of the Mur passed to the First Austrian Republic, while Oberradkersburg (Gornja Radgona) and the neighbouring municipality of Apače (Abstall), on the south bank, became part of Yugoslavia.  

The nationalist conflicts lingered on, on both sides of the border. In World War II many members of the German minority greeted the Wehrmacht invasion of Yugoslavia in 1941 and joined the German combat units, while large parts of Radkersburg were devastated by armed conflicts. After the war, most of the remaining German-speaking population south of the Mur was forcibly expelled. 

The Radkersburg bridge across the Mur was reopened on October 12, 1969, which led to a first rapprochement between Austria and Yugoslavia. In 1975 the town achieved spa status, another thermal spring was made accessible in 1978, soon followed by an extension to the bathing site. Since Slovenia joined the Schengen Area in 2007, border controls between Radkersburg and Gornja Radgona have been abolished.

Population

Politics

Seats in the municipal council (Gemeinderat) as of 2010 (local elections):
Austrian People's Party (ÖVP): 8
Citizens' List: 4
Social Democratic Party of Austria (SPÖ): 2
The Greens – The Green Alternative: 1

Twin towns

Bad Radkersburg is twinned with:
 Varaždin, Croatia
 Lenti, Hungary

Notable people
Andreas Walsperger (–?), cartographer 
Franz Leopold von Nádasdy (1708–1783), general
Marie Egner (1850–1940), painter
Leopold Vietoris (1891–2002), mathematician
Aribert Heim (1914–1992), SS doctor
Wolfgang Fasching (born 1967), cyclist
Peter Luttenberger (born 1972), cyclist

References

Divided cities
Austria–Slovenia border crossings
Spa towns in Austria
Cities and towns in Südoststeiermark District